Dato' Seri Zahrain bin Mohamed Hashim (born 12 November 1955) is a Malaysian politician previously from the People's Justice Party (PKR), a component party of then Pakatan Rakyat (PR) opposition coalition who served as the 16th Ambassador of Malaysia to Indonesia from September 2013 to June 2018 and Member of Parliament (MP) for Bayan Baru from March 2008 to May 2013. He is now an independent after leaving PR and PKR.

Political career
Zahrain was elected to Parliament in the 2008 election as a member of the opposition People's Justice Party (PKR). As Chairman of the Penang division of PKR, he had been criticised by his Pakatan Rakyat coalition partner, the Democratic Action Party, for speaking out against Penang Chief Minister Lim Guan Eng. In January 2010, he attacked Lim as being a "dictator, a chauvinist and communist-minded", citing what Zahrain saw as a failure by Lim to deliver on his election promises. He subsequently left PKR to sit in Parliament as an independent.

Diplomatic career
After leaving Parliament following the 2013 general elections, Zahrain was appointed as the Malaysia Ambassador to Indonesia.

Zahrain was recalled from his posting following the Pakatan Harapan (PH) government's decision to stop the previous practice adopted by the Barisan Nasional (BN) of appointing politicians to head overseas missions.

Election results

Honours
  :
  Officer of the Order of the Defender of State (DSPN) - Dato' (1995)
  Commander of the Order of the Defender of State (DGPN) - Dato' Seri (2009)

See also
 Bayan Baru (federal constituency)

References

Living people
1955 births
People from Penang
Members of the Dewan Rakyat
Former People's Justice Party (Malaysia) politicians
Ambassadors of Malaysia to Indonesia
Independent politicians in Malaysia
Malaysian people of Malay descent
Malaysian people of Minangkabau descent
Malaysian Muslims